Capucine Rousseau (born 21 April 1980) is a former professional tennis player from France.

Biography
Rousseau, a right-handed player from Croix in the far north of France, began competing on tour in 2000. She won her first ITF title in 2001 at Tortosa, where she had a win over Svetlana Kuznetsova en route. In 2003, she won two further ITF events, including a $25,000 level tournament in Ostrava. She featured in the women's doubles main draws at the 2003 and 2004 French Opens. Ranked as high as 118 in singles, she made her only WTA Tour main draw appearance at Hasselt in 2004. She received a wildcard into the 2005 Australian Open and lost a close first-round match to Tatiana Perebiynis, 5–7 in the third set.

Based in Brittany, Rousseau now works as a financial advisor for Allianz and also plays the sport of beach tennis competitively on the ITF Beach Tennis Tour.

ITF finals

Singles: 5 (3–2)

Doubles: 2 (0–2)

References

External links
 
 

1980 births
Living people
French female tennis players
People from Croix, Nord
Sportspeople from Nord (French department)